Pickens Museum is a fine arts museum with exhibition spaces at three locations in North Central Oklahoma:
 Pickens Learning Commons in the Vineyard Building at Northern Oklahoma College in Tonkawa, Oklahoma
 Pickens Museum at City Central in Ponca City, Oklahoma, and 
 Pickens Art Gallery at Woolaroc Museum in the Osage Hills of Northeastern Oklahoma between Barnsdall and Bartlesville

Pickens Museum displays Native American jewelry, African American Art, Native American art, art by Oklahoma artists, bronze sculptures and verdite sculptures from Zimbabwe.

Genres of Art in Pickens Museum

The mission of Pickens Museum is to enrich the lives of both visitors to and residents of North Central Oklahoma, to support the arts, and to promote the idea that there can be economic benefits to encouraging an artist community in North Central Oklahoma. 

Pickens Museum includes fine art from the following genres in its collection: 
 Native American Turquoise Jewelry by Jolene Bird, Bryon Yellowhorse, and Tanya Rafael; 
 African American art by Malvin Gray Johnson, Faith Ringgold, Varnette Honeywood, Barbara Chase-Riboud, Skip Hill, and Woodrow Nash; 
 Native American art by Allan Houser, Josue Sanchez, Yatika Starr Fields, Ed Natiya, Oreland Joe, and Clyde Otipoby; 
 Oklahoma art by Eugene Bavinger, John Free, Robert Hardee, Becky Manschreck, Roger Disney, and Daniel Pickens; 
 Bronze Sculptures by Donald De Lue, Paul Manship, Malvina Hoffman, Jo Davidson, Hermon Atkins MacNeil, Charles Cordier, Bryant Baker, Albert Wein, and Bill Kilpatrick; 
 Verdite Sculptures from Zimbabwe

Pickens Learning Commons at Northern Oklahoma College in Tonkawa Oklahoma

In February 2021 Northern Oklahoma College signed an agreement to display art works from Pickens Museum on their Tonkawa campus. “This is an exciting opportunity for us to share our art and culture with the Northern Oklahoma College community," said Hugh Pickens, Executive Director of Pickens Museum. Phase One of the project included the display of “Fool’s Crow” by native artist C. J. Wells in the library entrance of the Vineyard Library Administration Building and "Apache Warrior" by Malvina Hoffman. “This collection of art will add to the cultural enhancement of the Library and Cultural Engagement Center on the NOC Tonkawa campus. We are grateful for friends such as the Pickens who have chosen to share their gifts with us," said NOC President Cheryl Evans.

In August, 2022, Northern Oklahoma College announced the transformation of Vineyard Library into a contemporary Student Learning Commons named the Pickens Learning Commons, that includes two new permanent murals totaling 100’x20’ by artist Yatika Starr Fields, along with eighty art works from the Doctor Pickens Museum to be on long-term display.  Fields already created two existing murals in the Cultural Engagement Center, commissioned by the Doctor Pickens Museum in November 2020 and completed in June 2021.

Yatika Starr Fields' 100' x 20' mural in the Pickens Learning Commons includes several different scenes from Northern Oklahoma College including a woman looking through a microscope, show lambs, another woman looking through a stack of books, men in space looking through VR systems, NOC’s mascot, Mav the bull, the Roustabouts, and the different performing arts. "These all flow in a beautiful display of colors and an incredible show of knowledge."

Exhibit of Sculpture by Donald De Lue

In March 2021 Pickens Museum put on display 10 original sketches and the maquette for "Quest Eternal" by American sculptor Donald De Lue . “Quest Eternal” is one of De Lue’s best-known works with the 27-foot tall male figure erected in Boston in front of the Prudential Tower. Donald De Lue was the chief assistant to British sculptor Bryant Baker who created the iconic Pioneer Woman statue in Ponca City, Oklahoma. After the commission for the seventeen-foot sculpture was awarded to Baker by E.W. Marland De Lue set to work in 1928 and 1929 modeling it in Baker’s Brooklyn studio.

“Pickens Museum probably has the most complete collection of work by Donald De Lue in the world,” says Pickens. “I became interested in De Lue about 30 years ago when I learned of his role in creation of the Pioneer Woman. Our Museum now holds over forty of De Lue’s sculptures, over 100 of his original sketches, and 135 of De Lue’s original sketch books, that we have acquired over the years.”

Mural by Robert Hardee
Pickens Museum displays of two murals by Robert Hardee, an honorary member of the Ponca Tribe entitled “Route 66” and “Route 66 Roadhouse". “These two murals were originally commissioned for a restaurant in Ponca City and on display in their dining room,” says Hugh Pickens. “When the restaurant went out of business about 15 years ago, we had the opportunity to purchase the two murals for our collection.”

Mural by Yatika Starr Fields

In 2021 Pickens Museum commissioned a 20 foot by 60 foot mural by Osage Artist Yatika Starr Fields in the Cultural Engagement Center at Northern Oklahoma College. The CEC opened in 2017 and includes contemporary learning spaces where students, faculty, and/or tribal leaders can meet; individual study or collaborative projects can be conducted; culture-based learning activities and community/cultural events can be provided; professional development can be held; and small group or individual tutoring can occur.

Fields’ mural is alive with movement and filled with images that rely on vibrant colors and swirling patterns to show drums, beads, dancers, and horses. “When you dance, it’s always about movement and rhythm,” says Fields. “This is something that’s always been a part of my life. As any Native person knows who dances or participates in ceremonies, they understand that feeling of rhythm and place and movement.” That usage of movement and “swiftness” has since carried into his work, allowing it to flow from one end of the canvas to the other.

“When (NOC President) Cheryl Evans said they were looking for an artist to paint a mural for the engagement center, I immediately recommended Yatika,” says Pickens adding that Pickens Museum already has ten paintings by Fields in its permanent collection. “Yatika was delighted to have the opportunity to paint a mural that will inspire Native American students at NOC.”

Virtual Museum at Northern Oklahoma College
In September 2022, Northern Oklahoma College inaugurated a virtual museum at Pickens Learning Commons which shows seven web cams throughout the commons with views of the art on display in the museum.

Pickens Museum at City Central in Ponca City

In January, 2020 Pickens Museum opened an exhibition at City Central in Ponca City, Oklahoma titled “Winter in New York” which included three large paintings of Seventh and Eighth Avenues in New York City. The murals by Oklahoma artist Roger Disney, depict traffic near Times Square evoking the famous New Year’s Eve Ball that descends atop One Times Square.

On February 26, 2020 Pickens Museum opened an exhibition in the atrium of City Central at 400 E Central in Ponca City titled “Letter from a Birmingham Jail” which includes eight serigraphs by Faith Ringgold that depict major events in the Civil Rights Movement including “Freedom Summer” in Mississippi in 1964. “This is a opportunity for citizens of Ponca City to view art that are superlative accompaniments to Dr. King’s stirring text,” says Hugh Pickens. “The subjects and scenes that fill Ringgold’s compositions are inspired by the American experience. The themes are universal: inequality and the struggle for its eradication that should inspire us all.”

Pioneer Woman Mural
The Pioneer Woman mural on display in City Central was commissioned by Pickens Museum in 2015. According to Hugh Pickens, Executive Director of Pickens Museum in Ponca City, the srtist wanted to paint a mural that evoked Ponca City and “what could be more evocative of Ponca City than the Pioneer Woman.” “The primary challenge with the mural was finding a fresh approach to the subject matter,” says Pickens. “The Pioneer Woman has been done to death. It is too familiar to us in Ponca City and statewide. There have been many paintings of the Pioneer Woman over the years and its iconic power had begun to fade.” For that reason Daniel Pickens decided that the mural would consist of close-ups of the face of the Pioneer Woman from three different angles to create a new symbol of the Pioneer Woman symbol for our era. “This is a Pioneer Woman for the 21st Century.”

Pickens Museum puts monumental sculpture on display in Ponca City
The Ponca City News reported in September 2022 that Pickens Museum was putting the monumental bronze "Osage Warrior in the Enemy Camp” by Osage artist John Free on exhibit in Ponca City. The bronze, 12 feet long and 8 feet high, was commissioned by Pickens Museum and is on temporary display on Coppercreek in Ponca City. “I invite the public to drive by and see it,” said Hugh Pickens, Executive Director of Pickens Museum. “You can get out of your car and come over next to it if you wish to take photos but for safety reasons, please stay off the trailer.”

World's Largest Naja Goes on Display in Ponca City
In August, 2018 metallic sculptor Stephen Schwark put up a 20 foot Naja around the future location for Pickens Museum 2 miles west of Ponca City on Highway 60. The Naja is a traditional motif used by Navajo silversmiths as part of a squash blossom. One of the most important forms of Navajo and Southwestern Native American jewelry, is the Squash Blossom Necklace. Most are made of a string of plain round silver beads, interspersed with more stylized "squash blossoms", and feature a pendant, or "naja", hung from the center of the strand. According to the Navajo, the symbol of the Naja represents strength and protection and is held in very high esteem by the Navajo as well as other peoples.

Pickens Museum at Woolaroc
In August, 2022 Woolaroc Museum announced a partnership with Pickens Museum to display select pieces of fine art from the Pickens collection, including works by Native American artists Fritz Scholder, Allan Houser, and Yatika Starr Fields. “I am thrilled for Woolaroc to be able to partner with Hugh and showcase his collection here at Woolaroc,” stated Woolaroc Museum Director, Shiloh Thurman. “This partnership allows our visitors an opportunity to experience new and fresh artwork that is outside of our permanent collection on a rotational basis.” Woolaroc CEO, Kevin Hoch added, “Hugh has amassed an incredible collection of paintings, sculptures, and jewelry over the past five decades. We are proud to partner with him to diversify our guest experience and share his lifelong passion of the arts with our many supporters.”

Exhibition in Pawhuska
In October 2022 Pickens Museum placed the monumental sculpture "Osage Warrior in the Enemy Camp" on public exhibit between the Office of the Chiefs and the old superintendent’s house on the Osage Nation campus in Pawhuska for the sesquicentennial celebration of the founding of the Osage Reservation in Oklahoma.

External links 
 Pickens Museum
 Web Cams at Pickens Learning Commons at Northern Oklahoma College
 Pickens Gallery Opens at Woolaroc

References

Art museums and galleries in Oklahoma
Museums established in 2018